Maxim Volodymyrovych Prodan (born 13 February 1993) is a Ukrainian professional boxer who held the IBF International welterweight title from 2019 to September 2021.

Early life 

Prodan was born in Rynhach, Novoselytsia Raion, Chernivtsi region, Ukraine.

He was born to Ukrainian parents. His mother was born in Rynhach (Chernivtsi region) and his father comes from Hrozyntsi. Prodan started practicing boxing as a child.

He attended high school in Novoselytsia (graduating in 2008) and in 2010 graduated from Kamianets-Podilskyi Lyceum with enhanced military and physical training.

In 2014 he received his bachelor's degree in physical education at Chernivtsi University. In 2011 he became Candidate for Master of Sport.

In 2014 he moved to Bovisio Masciago, in Italy, where he currently lives.

Career 

At the age of 12 he moved to his aunt in Novoselytsia, where he began boxing.

From his home base in Ukraine, he boxed at regional, national, and later international tournaments. At the age of 18, he became a Candidate in Masters of Sports in boxing.

He studied at the sporting club "Boyan-Kolos" from 2007 to 2012. Prodan fought 60 times as an amateur, recording 50 victories.

At the age of 22, he debuted as a professional, defeating Hungarian Krisztian Duka by knockout. As of September 2021, Prodan won 19 out of 20 fights (15 by knockout), recording one draw due to an arm injury.

On 8 March 2019, he won the IBF International belt, defeating Belgian Steve Jamoye.

On 25 September 2021, he lost his IBF International Belt against Florian Marku. This was his first and only defeat in international career.

Professional boxing record

References

External links
 
 Facebook profile
 Instagram profile

Living people
1993 births
Ukrainian male boxers
Welterweight boxers
Ukrainian emigrants to Italy
Sportspeople from Vinnytsia Oblast